Strangers and Brothers is a 1984 British television series produced by the BBC. Adapted from the novel series of the same name by C. P. Snow, it ran for a single series of thirteen episodes.

Plot summary
The series focuses on the character Lewis Eliot and follows his life and career from humble beginnings to being a successful London lawyer, Cambridge don, wartime official in Whitehall, and civil servant, and finally to retirement. Eliot's private life is also explored, relating his unstable marriage to Sheila, his difficult affair with his second wife Margaret, and his relationships with his brother Martin and with the mercurial Roy Calvert.

The behind the scenes machinations in the election of a new Master at Eliot's college are explored.

The series also deals with the British scientific community's involvement in the development of nuclear weapons during the Second World War. The attempts by the ambitious politician Roger Quaife to halt Britain's nuclear programme results in scandal, and the loss of political influence by both Quaife and Eliot.

Cast

 Shaughan Seymour as  Lewis Eliot (13 episodes)
 Paul Hastings as Francis Getliffe (10 episodes) 
 Edward Hardwicke as Sir Hector Rose (7 episodes)
 Sheila Ruskin as Sheila Eliot (6 episodes)
 Cherie Lunghi as Margaret Eliot (5 episodes)
 James Simmons as Walter Luke (5 episodes)
 Nigel Havers as Roy Calvert (4 episodes)
 Peter Sallis as Leonard March (3 episodes)
 Stephen Riddle as Martin Eliot (3 episodes)
 Martin Jacobs as Charles March (3 episodes)
 Elizabeth Spriggs as Lady Muriel Royce (3 episodes)
 Carmen Du Sautoy as Ann Simon (3 episodes)
 Kathryn Pogson as Joan Royce (3 episodes)
 Neil Stacy as Herbert Getliffe (3 episodes)
 James Cossins as Mr. Knight (3 episodes) 
 Emma Jacobs as  Katherine March (3 episodes)
 Gawn Grainger as Dr. Pearson (3 episodes)
 John Grillo as Arthur Brown 3 episodes)
 Anthony Hopkins as Roger Quaife (2 episodes)
 Susan Fleetwood as Lady Caroline Quaife (2 episodes)
 Christopher Casson as  Austin Davidson (2 episodes)
 Tessa Peake-Jones as Irene Eliot (2 episodes)
 Frederick Treves as Vernon Royce (2 episodes)
 John Carson as Jago (2 episodes)
 Simon Oates as Major Darling (2 episodes)
 Tom Wilkinson as George Passant (2 episodes)
 Tony Britton as Lord Boscastle (2 episodes)
 Joan Greenwood as Lady Boscastle (2 episodes)
 John Normington as  Monty Cave (2 episodes)
 Gareth Thomas as Arthur Mounteney (2 episodes)
 John Phillips as Reggie Collingwood (2 episodes) 
 Alan MacNaughtan as Winslow (2 episodes)
 Michael Cochrane as  Sammikins (2 episodes)
 Peter Copley as Despard-Smith (2 episodes)
 Tom Chadbon as Sir Douglas Osbaldiston (2 episodes)
 Michael Troughton as Jack Cotery (2 episodes)
 Gillian Bailey as Olive Calvert (2 episodes)
 Jeffry Wickham as Chrystal (2 episodes)
 Andrew Cruickshank as  M.H.L. Gay (1 episode)
 Terence Alexander as R.S.Robinson (1 episode)
 Cyril Luckham as Eustace Pilbrow (1 episode)

Critical reception
In a 1985 review in The New York Times, John J. O'Connor praised only the episode based on the novel The Masters and called the series a "dud" and summarized; "the series as a whole—or at least its first half—fails to ignite with compelling characters and incidents. The themes are big, the issues are important, but Strangers and Brothers is a monumental disappointment."

References

Bibliography
Ellen Baskin. Serials on British Television, 1950-1994. Scolar Press, 1996.

External links
 

BBC television dramas
1984 British television series debuts
1984 British television series endings
English-language television shows
Television shows based on British novels